Guido Corbelli (13 March 1913 – 30 November 1994) was an Italian former professional footballer and manager who played as a winger.

Corbelli played in Serie A with Venezia, Atalanta and Milan, making 113 appearances and scoring 17 goals.

Playing career

Club
After having spent two seasons in Serie D in Emilian clubs, he moved to Anconitana, where he stayed for five seasons and reached the Serie B. The following season Corbelli moved to Venezia, where he stayed two seasons, the second of which in Serie A.

In the summer of 1940, he moved to Atalanta, in which he played two seasons in Serie A. Then, he moved to Milan, when he played his last season in Serie A in the 1942–43 season.

International
On 3 March 1940, Corbelli made his first and only appearance in the Italy national football team against Switzerland and scored the Italian goal.

Management career
Guido Corbelli was manager of Cosenza, Mestrina and Forlì.

Honours

Club 

 Anconitana
 Serie C: 1936–37

References

External links

 Guido Corbelli at Enciclopediadelcacio.it

Italian footballers
Italy international footballers
1913 births
1994 deaths
Association football wingers